Kanoon Farhangi Amoozesh is a private organization in Iran’s educational sector founded by Kazem Ghalamchi offering a wide range of educational products and services such as bi-weekly exams, personal tutoring and educational books to 450,000 students all around the country who are competing on Competitive examination for university seats.This institution have donated a lot of money to build a great deal of schools in poor provinces of Iran like Kurdistan and Sistan and Baluchestan. 

In 1993 Kanoon held its first exam with about 100 students at Daneshjoo high school in Tehran. Soon, this service proved to be extremely popular, encouraging the rapid expansion of Kanoon around Iran and also the diversification of its services towards providing educational books, customized planning and personal tutoring. These services were designed to allow students to evaluate their performance nationally through different periods in order to show them where and how they could improve their learning. Kanoon also provides free books and membership for those students who have financial difficulties. Kanoon also has numerous schools under the name "Saraye Danesh". Saraye Danesh has branches all around Iran.

Kanoon Publishing House is one of the leading organizations in Iran. Kanoon Publishing House is pioneered in educational book sector in Iran with the core idea of classifying reading subjects. One of the iconic attributes of Kanoon’s publishing is its classified educational books, which are branded in different colours.
This institution is the cause of not eliminating the national entrance exam for universities in Iran and has created a big mafia in the field of education.

References

External links
 Official website
 English website

Education in Iran
Book publishing companies of Iran